Valea Verde may refer to:

 Valea Verde, a village in Grădiniţa Commune, Căuşeni district, Moldova
 Valea Verde, a village in Sohodol Commune, Alba County, Romania

See also
Valea (disambiguation)